"Indians" is a song by American thrash metal band Anthrax, from the band's third studio album, Among the Living (1987). It has since then remained one of the band's signature songs, appearing on their best-of albums: Return of the Killer A's, Madhouse: The Very Best of Anthrax and Anthrology: No Hit Wonders (1985–1991).

It appears in the Guitar Hero game Guitar Hero: Warriors of Rock and as downloadable content for the Rock Band series and Rocksmith 2014.

Music video
The music video features Anthrax playing the song live. It was directed by Jean Pellerin.

Single
A single was released, it was also the first single for the album, displaying a Native American on a coin (like that of a U.S. nickel and/or Indian Head cent) with a purple background.

Track listing
"Indians"
"Sabbath Bloody Sabbath" (includes "Taint" by Stormtroopers of Death after a fade out)

Personnel
Joey Belladonna – vocals
Scott Ian – rhythm guitar
Dan Spitz – lead guitar
Frank Bello – bass
Charlie Benante – drums

Charts

See also
 List of anti-war songs

References 

1987 songs
1987 singles
Anthrax (American band) songs
Songs against racism and xenophobia
Songs about Native Americans
Songs written by Joey Belladonna
Songs written by Dan Spitz
Songs written by Scott Ian
Songs written by Frank Bello
Songs written by Charlie Benante
Island Records singles